Brendan Evans was the defending champion, but he lost in the first round against Kyu-tae Im.
Florian Mayer won in the final 6-3, 6-0, against Flavio Cipolla.

Seeds

  Florian Mayer (champion)
  Josselin Ouanna (second round)
  Brendan Evans (first round)
  David Guez (semifinals)
  Édouard Roger-Vasselin (first round)
  Flavio Cipolla (final)
  Kevin Anderson (semifinals)
  Michael Yani (second round)

Draw

Finals

Top half

Bottom half

External links
Main Draw

Internationaux de Nouvelle-Caledonie - Singles
2010 - Singles